Løvlien is a surname. Notable people with the surname include:

Emil Løvlien (1899–1973), Norwegian trade unionist and politician
Ida Marie Løvlien (born 1974), Norwegian politician
Ole H. Løvlien (1897–1970), Norwegian politician
Ronny Løvlien (born 1971), Norwegian footballer